Super K Productions was a 1960s American recording production company under Buddah Records, headed by producers Jerry Kasenetz and Jeffry Katz, whose groups specialized in bubblegum pop.  Their biggest successes were The Ohio Express, The 1910 Fruitgum Company, Crazy Elephant and The Music Explosion.  Super K also had its own label of the same name in 1969, operated under Buddah Records, but it did not last as the bubblegum genre had already started to decline in popularity.

Not a company to depend on double-sided hits, many (but not all) Super K-produced singles were pressed with B-sides of either tracks recorded backwards or studio group instrumentals. This method was also employed earlier by producers Phil Spector and Joe Meek as a way of pointing a radio DJ to the "right" side of the singles.

In the 1970's they had a small Recording Studio and Production office in Great Neck, NY, on East Shore Drive, just north of Northern Blvd. on Long Island.

Super K Production groups
Crazy Elephant
Bo Diddley (One single: "Bo Diddley 1969"/"Soul Train")
Kasenetz-Katz Singing Orchestral Circus
Music Explosion
1910 Fruitgum Company
Ohio Express
Professor Morrison's Lollipop
Shadows Of Knight

American companies established in 1966
Companies based in Ohio
Defunct companies based in Ohio
1966 establishments in Ohio